The Kelani River is a  river in Sri Lanka. Ranking as the fourth-longest river in the country, it stretches from the Sri Pada Mountain Range to Colombo. It flows through or borders the Sri Lankan districts of Nuwara Eliya, Ratnapura, Kegalle, Gampaha and Colombo. The Kelani River also flows through the capital of Sri Lanka, Colombo, and provides 80% of its drinking water.

Hydrology
The Kelani River has two main tributaries in its upper reaches: the Kehelgamu Oya and the Maskeli Oya. These two contribute to hydro-electric production in Sri Lanka, housing several major reservoirs, ponds and power stations. Castlereigh Reservoir and Norton Reservoir are constructed across the Kehelgamu Oya, while Maskeliya Reservoir, Canyon Reservoir and Laxapana Reservoir are constructed across the Maskeli Oya. In its lower reaches, some more tributaries connect to the Kelani River, out of which the most famous are the We Oya at Yatiyanthota, the Gurugoda Oya at Ruwanwella, and the Seethawaka Ganga at Avissawella.

Hydrometry and usage

The Kelani supplies approximately 80% of the water used in Colombo. In addition, the river is used for transport, fisheries, sewage disposal, sand mining and for production of hydroelectricity. Through these factors, many people depend on the river for their daily routine in life. From a barge, people dive to the river bed, from where the sand is lifted to the barge in a bucket, and when the barge is full, it is taken to the river bank and unloaded by a separate team. At present, two main concerns in connection with the river are flooding during the monsoon and saline intrusion in the dry season.

In addition, Kelani River water levels affect the flood risk to Colombo, the capital of Sri Lanka, to a considerable extent. One reason is that part of the city and suburbs of Colombo lies on the lower flood plain of the river. Exposure of Colombo and the upper catchments of Kelani River to the South West Monsoon is another reason.

The problems are related: the saline intrusion is enhanced by the deepening of the river caused by sand mining. Regulation, in order to prevent saline intrusion, can reduce the water quality in other ways, and can increase the flood risk. Sand mining is economically important nationally and to the many people involved.

The Kelani stream flow was investigated just upstream of Ambatale at Hanwella, with engineers analyzing the river discharges from 1973 to 2004 (in million m³/month).

Cultural references
Kelani River is connected closely with the Sinhala Buddhist culture of Sri Lanka, especially with the people living on the area identified as the Kelani Valley. This derives primarily from the fact that the Kelani River is associated with two of the most venerated Buddhist shrines and pilgrimages, i.e. Sri Pada Mountain and Kelani Raja Maha Viharaya. There are a number of folk poems that mention the Kelani River, such as the following:

Folk Poems 

මලේ මලේ ඔය නා මල නෙළා වරෙන්
අත්ත බිඳෙයි පය බුරුලෙන් තබා වරෙන්
කැලණි ගඟේ ඔරු යනවා බලා වරෙන්
සාදුකාර දී ඔරුවක නැගී වරෙන්
මහවැලි කැලණි කලු වලවේ යන ගංගා
සමනොළ කන්ද මුදුනේ සිට පැන නැංගා
බෑවුම් තැනිතලා හෙල් අතරින් රිංගා
මේවා ගලයි මිණි කැට දිය යට හංගා

Hansa Sandeshaya 
සමනොළ මුදුන සිරිපද ඔබන   

මගුලට
නිකසල මහ සඟන ගෙන වඩින  

මුනිඳුට
පැහැදුල සුනිල් මිණියෙන් කළ මග ලෙසට

මනදොළ පිරෙයි ගඟ සිරිසර දුටු තොපට

The Kalyani Ordination Hall in Bago, Myanmar derives its name from the Kelani River.

Special features
The Academy Award-winning The Bridge on the River Kwai was filmed on the Kelani River near Kitulgala, although nothing remains now except the concrete foundations for the bridge (and, supposedly, the submerged train cars that plunged into the river in the climactic scene).

Bridges over Kelani River
The following table shows the major bridges over the Kelani River:

See also 
 Geography of Sri Lanka
 List of rivers in Sri Lanka
 Kelani River-Peliyagoda Waterdrome
 Biyagama Water Treatment Plant

References

Bodies of water of Colombo District
Bodies of water of Gampaha District
Geography of Colombo
Rivers of Sri Lanka